José Santiago de Bonilla y Laya-Bolívar was president of the Junta Superior Gubernativa of Costa Rica from April to July 1822. His brother Miguel de Bonilla y Laya-Bolívar was also a politician.

Vice presidents of Costa Rica
1756 births
1824 deaths
Costa Rican liberals